Tshering Dorji aka Tshagay (born 11 September 1995) is a Bhutanese professional footballer who plays for Thimphu City FC as a midfielder.

Dorji is best known for the late goal he scored against Sri Lanka, which gave Bhutan their first ever win in the World Cup qualification.

As of March 2015, he was studying at the Royal Thimphu College as a first year student.

Club career

South United
On 20 December 2018, it was announced that Tshering Dorji signed for Bengaluru-based club
South United FC, which plays in the I-League 2nd Division, the tried tier of Indian football.

Madhya Bharat
In 2019, he joined the newly formed club from Bhopal, Madhya Bharat SC, which has earlier played in the 2017–18 season of the I-League 2nd Division.

International career
Dorji represents Bhutan in international football since 2011. He made his senior debut on 12 March against Sri Lanka in 3–0 loss match at the 2011 SAFF Championship in New Delhi.

International statistics
Scores and results list the Bhutan's goal tally first.

See also
 Bhutan international footballers

References

1995 births
Living people
Bhutanese footballers
Transport United F.C. players
People from Trashiyangtse District
Bhutan international footballers
Association football midfielders
Expatriate footballers in India
Bhutanese expatriate sportspeople in India
South Asian Games silver medalists for Bhutan
South Asian Games medalists in football